Condé Nast is a major American magazine publisher. Condé Nast may also refer to:

Condé Montrose Nast (1873–1942), founder of the publisher
Condé Nast Building, the publisher's headquarters, in Times Square